Trowell services is a motorway service station off the M1 motorway in Trowell, Nottinghamshire, England, situated north of Junction 25. Opened in 1967 by Mecca Leisure, it is currently owned by Moto. The services are situated near Nottingham.

History

Construction
The service area was going to be slightly further south, nearer to the A609, with planning permission given in April 1962. It was built by John Laing. Laing also built Keele around the same time; Laing had also built five teaching blocks and eight halls of residence at the University of Nottingham. It was known as the Mecca Village. The site was planned to open in summer 1966, with the contract given on Monday 20 January 1964, and construction was to start in 1965.

It opened on Thursday 23 March 1967, with a special area for dogs, developed with the RSPCA. At the opening were around 300 people, with many chairmen of local rural district councils, and the Sheriff of Nottingham, Elliot Durham, and Alan Fairley, joint chairman of Mecca Ltd.

It had 24 acres, and employed 300, being opened seven months after the M1 motorway section; this section of motorway took two years to be built, and cost £4.75m; the motorway section was built from junction 25 to Stanton by Dale by George Wimpey, and the next part to junction 26 was built by Robert M Douglas; the section was opened on Thursday 25 August 1966. The motorway section was meant to open in January 1966, part of the Lockington-Nuthall section.

Decoration
George Dereford, a Hungarian artist from Marlow, Buckinghamshire, made two three-dimensional mosaic murals about Robin Hood, in an Aztec style, near the entrances, being seven foot high called The Fighting Horsemen and The Archer. He designed the first stamps for the Isle of Man, when it formed its own post office system on 5 July 1973. The Robin Hood Way currently follows half of the service road, to the east.

Food
There were 6 catering units; the site could cater for up to 750 in 1966
 Sheriff's Restaurant, 190 seats, open from 7.30am until 2am, waitress service
 North Forest Cafe, seated 150, open from 7am until 11pm, self-service
 South Forest Cafe, as the North cafe
 Truckers had the North Transport Club, 60 seats, from 7am to 11pm and a South Transport Club, but only open from Monday-Friday for both

On Sunday 9 July 1967, Long Eaton took 27 visitors from its twin town of Romorantin-Lanthenay, in France, for lunch in the main restaurant, followed by a visit to Charnwood Forest and Melbourne Hall. Manageresses completed two-year catering and hotel management courses at Clarendon College of Further Education.

Buildings
It had 60 petrol pumps, a post office, a RAC station, a police station, with Robin Hood shields in the entrance. There was a business conference building for up to 250 people. The car parks were for 400 vehicles. It was managed from Trowell Hall.

Use in aviation
The services are also a Visual Reference and Reporting Point for general aviation traffic entering East Midlands Airport controlled airspace from the north.

References

External links 
Trowell Services — Motorway Services Online
Motorway Services Trivia website — Trowell
On the road in middle England: Midnight in Nowheresville – article in The Economist about 24 hours at Trowell services

1965 establishments in the United Kingdom
M1 motorway service stations
Moto motorway service stations
Buildings and structures in Nottinghamshire
Transport in Nottinghamshire